Ali Asghar Mohtaj (1943) is a contemporary Iranian painter and Graphic Designer. He studied painting and graduated from the Faculty of Fine Arts at Tehran University in 1966.

He was employed at National Iranian Radio and Television in 1972 and worked as a graphic designer at Soroush Publication. One of his most prominent works of art was creating the title sequence of "Dalirane Tangestan" series in the form of animation. He designed the poster for the film "Mina of the Silent City" (original title Minā-ye Shahr-e Khāmoush) directed by Amir Shahab Razavian. He was secretary of the first Biennial of Iranian Graphic Design.

Exhibitions 
 Ghandriz Gallery - Group Exhibition- 1966
 Sabz Gallery – Solo Exhibition- 1996
 Homa Gallery – Solo Exhibition- 2007
 Imam Ali Museum – “A selection of Iranian Theatre Posters from 1970 to 1990 “– Group Exhibition- 2013
 A Gallery – “Marked Designer”, Arapik Baghdasarian's Artworks – Group Exhibition- 2017

Academic career
He has been professor of graphic design at the University of Tehran.

References

1943 births
Living people
Iranian painters